Goniatitidae is one of three families included in the ammonoid cephalopod superfamily Goniatitoidea, known from the Lower Mississippian to the Upper Permian. They have sutures that form 8 lobes and characteristically lack sculpture. The ventral lobe, as for the superfamily, is bifurcated.

References
 Miller, Furnish, and Schindewolf 1957.  Paleozoic Ammonoidea; Treatise on Invertebrate Paleontology, Part L Ammonoidea.  Geologocial Society of America and Univ of Kansas Press. 
Goniatitidae Paleo db 9/07/13

 
Goniatitida families
Goniatitoidea